Gleibat El Foula is a town in the disputed territory of Western Sahara. It is administered by Morocco as a rural commune in Oued Ed-Dahab Province in the region of Dakhla-Oued Ed-Dahab. At the time of the 2004 census, the commune had a total population of 2973 people living in 42 households.

References

Populated places in Oued Ed-Dahab Province
Rural communes of Dakhla-Oued Ed-Dahab